Spahija is a Kosovo Albania surname of Persian origin derived from the word spahi (سپاهی, sepâhi; horseman, soldier), that entered Albanian from the Turkish adaption Sipahi (horseman, cavalryman). Notable people with the surname include:
Hrvoje Spahija (born 1988), Croatian footballer
Neven Spahija (born 1962), Croatian basketball coach

See also
Spahia (surname)
Spahić 
Sipahioğlu

References

Albanian-language surnames